The 2015–16 Melbourne Victory FC season was the club's 11th season since its establishment in 2004. The club participated in the A-League for the 11th time, the FFA Cup for the second time, as well as the AFC Champions League for the fifth time.

Players

First-team squad

From youth squad

Transfers in

Transfers out

Technical staff

Statistics

Squad statistics

Pre-season and friendlies

Competitions

Overall

A-League

League table

Results summary

Results by round

Matches

Finals series

FFA Cup

AFC Champions League

Group stage

Round of 16

References

External links
 Official Website

Melbourne Victory
Melbourne Victory FC seasons